Ruud Bosch (born 28 July 1984) is a former Dutch male badminton player. He was a doubles specialist. He became a member of the Netherlands national badminton team in 2004, then in 2006, he won a silver medal at the European Badminton Mixed Team Championships.  After quitting the Men's Doubles combination with Dutch partner Koen Ridder after eight years in August 2014, Bosch moved to Taiwan to form a new combination with Tien Tzu-Chieh in Men's Doubles and Shuai Pei-ling in Mixed Doubles. After two years in Taiwan, he returned to Europe to play again in the German Bundesliga for his German club Union Lüdinghausen. He won the Dutch National Badminton Championships seven times, four times in Men's Doubles (2006, 2009, 2011 and 2013) and three times in Mixed Doubles (2008, 2011 and 2013). In December 2018, Bosch was appointed as head coach of the Netherlands.

Achievements

European Junior Championships
Boys' Doubles

BWF International Challenge/Series

Men's doubles

Mixed doubles

 BWF International Challenge tournament
 BWF International Series tournament
 BWF Future Series tournament

References

External links
 
 

1984 births
Living people
Dutch male badminton players